In the Bishop's Carriage is a 1913 American silent drama film produced by Famous Players Film Company film company and starring Mary Pickford. It is based on the novel of the same name by Miriam Michelson. This film is lost.

The story was filmed again in 1920 by Zukor as She Couldn't Help It, starring Bebe Daniels.

Cast
Mary Pickford as Nance Olden
David Wall as Tom Dorgan
House Peters as Obermuller
Grace Henderson as Mrs. Ramsay
George Moss as The Bishop
Howard Missimer as Detective
Camilla Dalberg as The Actress
John Steppling as Mr. Ramsey

See also
List of Paramount Pictures films

References

External links

American silent feature films
Films directed by Edwin S. Porter
Films directed by J. Searle Dawley
Films based on American novels
Lost American films
American black-and-white films
American crime drama films
1910s crime drama films
1913 lost films
Lost drama films
1913 drama films
1910s American films
Silent American drama films